The Europa Race, in the IMOCA class, is a sailing race. Its course through Europe includes Istanbul, Barcelona, Brest,  Hambourg and  Cowes.

The Europa Race brings together a fleet of about fifteen boats every two years.

References

External links
 Europa Race website

Sailing competitions
Sailing in Turkey
Yachting races
Recurring sporting events established in 2009